Sang Tarashan (also Romanized as Sang Tarāshān; also known as Nowzhīyān and Nūzhīān) is a village in Keshvar Rural District, Papi District, Khorramabad County, Lorestan Province, Iran. At the 2006 census, its population was 241, in 52 families.

References 

Towns and villages in Khorramabad County